The Angolan Men's Basketball League, (in Portuguese: Campeonato Nacional de Basquetebol em Séniores Masculinos) is the top tier men’s basketball league in Angola.

The league was formerly known as BAI Basket, BIC Basket and Unitel Basket, named after its major sponsors, formerly Banco Africano de Investimentos, Banco de Investimento e Crédito and Unitel, the competition is organized by the Angolan Basketball Federation.

Primeiro de Agosto has been the most successful club in Angola with a total of 19 titles won, followed by Petro de Luanda, with 15.

Sponsorship names 
In 2014, the Angolan Basketball Federation signed a sponsoring deal with Angola's Banco de Investimento e Crédito, which it claimed to be more favourable than the one with Banco Africano de Investimentos. Such agreement caused the league to be renamed as BIC Basket.

Current teams
The following 12 teams play in the 2021–22 season:

Before independence

It wasn't until 1963 that the Portuguese national basketball championship began to include clubs from the províncias ultramarinas (overseas provinces) of Angola and Mozambique. This new format began with one team from each of the three locations and then changed to two teams from the host and one from each of the remaining two locations, who played a round-robin (then double round-robin) tournament to determine the champion of Portugal, with the championship taking place alternatively at each of the three capitals: Luanda (Angola), Lourenço Marques (Mozambique) and Lisbon/Porto (Portugal). From 1963 to 1974, 12 championships were held, with only one Angolan club succeeding to win the championship: Benfica de Luanda in 1967

Total league championships

List of champions and finals

MVP award winners and statistical leaders

Performance by club
The following teams have won the Angolan championship:

League details (2000s)

League details (1980s)

See also
 Angola 2nd Division Basketball
 Angola Cup
 Angola Super Cup
 Federação Angolana de Basquetebol

External links
Official Website 
Eurobasket.com League Page

References

 
Basketball leagues in Angola
Angola
1977 establishments in Angola
Sports leagues established in 1977